The 1966 Cupa României Final was the 28th final of Romania's most prestigious football cup competition. It was disputed between Steaua București and UTA Arad, and was won by Steaua București after a game with 4 goals. It was the 7th cup for Steaua București.

Match details

See also 
List of Cupa României finals

References

External links
Romaniansoccer.ro

1966
Cupa
Romania